Norman Ella (18 June 1910 – 19 January 1987) was an Australian rowing coxswain. He competed in the men's eight event at the 1936 Summer Olympics.

Rowing career
Ella rowed for the New South Wales Police club in Sydney. In 1936 the Police Club's eight dominated the Sydney racing season, the New South Wales state titles and won the Henley-on-Yarra event. They were selected in toto as Australia's men's eight to compete at the 1936 Berlin Olympics with their attendance funded by the NSW Police Federation.  The Australian eight with Ella in the stern finished fourth in its heat, behind Hungary, Italy and Canada. It failed to qualify through the repechage to the final.

War service
In WWII Ella served in the Australian Army. He enlisted early in the war in 1940 and had the rank of corporal when he was discharged in 1944.

References

1910 births
1987 deaths
Australian male rowers
Olympic rowers of Australia
Rowers at the 1936 Summer Olympics
Rowers from Sydney
20th-century Australian people